Law & Justice (also known as The Christian Law Review) is a biannual peer-reviewed academic legal periodical published by The Edmund Plowden Trust.  The primary focus of the journal is a Christian perspective of the law, with a particular emphasis on religious freedom, canon law, ethics and morality.

The current editor is John Duddington, former head of the Law School at Worcester College of Technology.

See also
Edmund Plowden

Associated websites
Law & Justice
Worcester Law School

British law journals
Law and religion journals